Our Time (also known as Death of Her Innocence) is a 1974 American drama film directed by Peter Hyams. The film was written by Jane C. Stanton, and stars Pamela Sue Martin, Parker Stevenson and Betsy Slade. The story is set at a Massachusetts school for girls in the 1950s.

Plot
Penfield was a girls school in 1955. The curriculum ranged from Latin to Etiquette, from Shakespeare to Field Hockey. Abigail is one of the new girls coming in to learn about these and other subjects. Coming from a well to do family, she hopes to be the school's best student. Just as she is getting started in the school, she meets Michael, a male student in the school. Soon the two fall deeply in love, but their relationship becomes challenged by those around them, leading to difficulties and tragedy.

At the center of the movie is the friendship between Abigail and Muffy at an all-girls boarding school. The film concludes with Abigail being the only one of the two who graduates. Muffy, whose one-night stand with Malcolm resulted in a pregnancy, dies subsequently after having an abortion.

Cast

Production
The film was produced by Richard Roth, who had just made Summer of '42 and wanted to do a similar kind of film about women. The movie was also known as Basic Training and The Girls of Penfield. It was based on an original screenplay by Jane Stanton.

Peter Hyams had previously made Busting, an R-rated movie about vice cops which had not performed well commercially. With Our Time, "I was trying to do the opposite of what I had done before," he says.

Pamela Sue Martin, Parker Stevenson, Edith Atwater and George O'Hanlon Jr. all would star in The Hardy Boys/Nancy Drew Mysteries later in the 1970s.

Reception
Vincent Canby of The New York Times wrote that the film "combines the worst features of two kinds of ancient Broadway comedy with a gothic lack of sensibility all its own," and found it "difficult to believe" that Peter Hyams "was also the director of the recent 'Busting,' one of the better, more intelligent cop movies. Perhaps teen-age rich girls are not characters with whom he has much sympathy or understanding." Gene Siskel of the Chicago Tribune gave the film 1 star out of 4 and wrote that it "probably sees itself as the female equivalent of 'Summer of '42' ... Unfortunately, the story this time is nothing more than a B-grade soap opera." Arthur D. Murphy of Variety called it "an unexciting, sterile story ... More of a made-for-TV feature than anything else." Kevin Thomas of the Los Angeles Times was positive, stating that the film "turns nostalgia back on itself with remarkable deftness and subtlety. In doing so it makes certain aspects of the '70s seem not all that bad." He added that "All four of the film's young stars are able and appealing." Tom Shales of The Washington Post wrote that "Muffy has no redeeming values; she's loathsome and self-pitying. So who are we supposed to care about, much less root for?"

See also
 List of American films of 1974

References

External links
 
 
 

1974 films
1974 drama films
American coming-of-age drama films
1970s coming-of-age drama films
1970s English-language films
Films scored by Michel Legrand
Films about abortion
Films directed by Peter Hyams
Films set in 1955
Films set in schools
Films set in Massachusetts
Films with screenplays by Peter Hyams
Warner Bros. films
1970s American films